Magaliella punctata is a species of beetle in the family Cerambycidae, the only species in the genus Magaliella.

References

Elaphidiini